Fernet is an Italian type of amaro, a bitter, aromatic spirit. Fernet is made from a number of herbs and spices which vary according to the brand, but usually include myrrh, rhubarb, chamomile, cardamom, aloe, and especially saffron, with a base of distilled grape spirits.

Fernet is usually served as a digestif after a meal but may also be served with coffee and espresso or mixed into coffee and espresso drinks. It typically contains 45% alcohol by volume. It may be served at room temperature or with ice.

The Italian liqueur has a cult following in the international bartending community and is immensely popular in Argentina. The South American country consumes more than 75% of all fernet produced globally and, due to the product's popularity, also has Fratelli Branca's only distillery outside of Italy. As it is traditionally mixed with Coke, fernet has also contributed in making Argentina one of the biggest consumers of Coca-Cola in the world. Fernet and Coke (Spanish: fernet con coca) is so ubiquitous in Argentina that it has been described as "the country's unofficial drink". This combination is called fernandito or viajero (traveller).

Popularity

In Argentina

Fernet was introduced to Argentina by Italians during the Great European immigration wave to the country of the late 19th century and early 20th century. It is particularly associated with Córdoba Province, which has been called "the world fernet capital"; almost three million litres are consumed there annually, representing just under 30 percent of national consumption. National production is around 25 million liters, with 35% sold in Buenos Aires city and province. Fernet-Branca is by far the most popular brand in the country, leading the market and reaching a "mythical" status among Argentines. Other popular brands include 1882, Capri, Ramazzotti and Vittone.

Fernet is commonly mixed with Coca-Cola, a mixed drink known as fernet con coca (Spanish for "fernet and Coke") or fernando. While long available, the drink became much more popular in the mid-1980s, encouraged by advertisements of Fratelli Branca in TV stations with national scope, its popularity growing steadily ever since. Consumption of fernet increased greatly in the first decade of the 21st century. By the early 2010s, the popularity of relatively inexpensive fernet was so high that many bars in Buenos Aires removed it from their menus to encourage sales of more expensive drinks.

In the US
The drink has been popular in the San Francisco Bay Area since before Prohibition. In 2008, San Francisco accounted for 25% of US consumption. San Francisco bars usually serve fernet as a shot followed by a ginger ale chaser.

In the Czech Republic 
The Czech-manufactured Fernet Stock brand is popular in the Czech Republic, where it is served as shots or as part of different cocktails.

Cocktails
Fernet can be mixed into cocktails, though the strong taste can overwhelm other ingredients. It can replace bitters in recipes; for instance, the Fanciulli cocktail is a Manhattan with fernet instead of Angostura bitters.

The chef Fergus Henderson offers a recipe, entitled both "A Miracle" and "Dr. Henderson", that approximates Branca Menta (a fernet with menthols and peppermint), by combining two parts fernet with one part crème de menthe over ice.  The recipe describes this cocktail as a cure for overindulgence.

In popular culture
Fernet-Branca forms the titular subject of James Hamilton-Paterson's 2004 novel of Tuscany expatriate life, Cooking with Fernet Branca.

Mike and the Moonpies' 2019 song "You Look Good in Neon" makes reference to Fernet in its chorus. Fans of the band have taken to buying shots of the drink at concerts.

See also

References

External links 
 

Argentine alcoholic drinks
Bitters
Distilled drinks
Food and drink in the San Francisco Bay Area
Italian liqueurs